Kunwara (Bachelor) is a 2000 Indian Hindi comedy film directed by David Dhawan, with cinematography by Chota K. Naidu, and was released on July 14th, 2000. This film opened with negative reviews from critics, leading to an unsuccessful run at the box office. The film stars Govinda, Urmila Matondkar, Nagma, Om Puri, Kader Khan and Johnny Lever in lead roles. The film is a remake of the Telugu film Bavagaru Bagunnara.

Plot
Raju and Urmila meet in New Zealand and fall in love. They plan to meet again very soon in  India. On the way, Raju meets a woman named Sharmila, a heartbroken, suicidal pregnant woman who tells Raju of her cruel boyfriend. In order to save her respect, Raju decides to play her husband role and they return together Sharmila's home, where he meets her family. However, soon enough, Raju finds out that Urmila is none other than Sharmila's sister.

Cast
 Govinda as Raju Sachdeva      
 Inder Kumar as Ajay Thakur
 Urmila Matondkar as Urmila Singh 
 Nagma as Sharmila Singh
 Om Puri as Balraj Singh (Sharmila's father)
 Shammi as Mrs. Vishwanath Pratap Singh
 Johnny Lever as Gopal Ahuja (Raju's friend)
 Smita Jaykar as Balraj's Wife  
 Mohan Joshi as Inder's Dad  
 Raza Murad as  Prithvi Thakur (Ajay's dad)
 Kader Khan as Vishwanath Pratap Singh (Balraj's father)
 Aasif Sheikh as Inder Jaiswal
 Gavin Packard as Henchman  of Prithvi Thakur
 Jeetu Verma as Henchman  of Prithvi Thakur

Reception and awards
Kunwara received mostly negative reviews from critics, although some of the performances were received well. Sukanya Verma from Rediff.com wrote, "Don't ask any questions. Don't look for any kind of logic. Go with the flow. Otherwise, you're not ready for this David Dhawan-Govinda flick." Taran Adarsh of Bollywood Hungama criticised the film, concluding, "Kunwara has the super-successful David Dhawan-Govinda combination as its strong point, but the film pales in comparison to the hits the two have delivered earlier. The film may start off well, but it lacks a good script to sustain after the initial curiosity subsides."

Kunwara was nominated for two awards in the same category at the annual Filmfare Awards:
Filmfare Award for Best Performance in a Comic Role - Govinda
Filmfare Award for Best Performance in a Comic Role - Johnny Lever

Music 

The soundtrack of the film contains 8 songs. The music is composed by Aadesh Shrivastava, with lyrics authored by Sameer. According to the Indian trade website Box Office India, with around 13,00,000 units sold, this film's soundtrack album was the year's fourteenth highest-selling.

References

External links

2000 films
2000s Hindi-language films
Films directed by David Dhawan
Hindi remakes of Telugu films
Films shot in New Zealand
Films scored by Aadesh Shrivastava
Geetha Arts films
Films shot in Switzerland